Kendrick is an unincorporated community outside Ocala in Marion County, Florida, United States. It is named for former Florida State Senator, lecturer, and pioneer William H. Kendrick.

Notable person
William V. Chappell, Jr., politician and lawyer, was born in Kendrick.

Notes

Unincorporated communities in Marion County, Florida
Unincorporated communities in Florida